The 2016 ZS-Sports China International Challenger was a professional tennis tournament played on clay courts. It was the 1st edition of the tournament which was part of the 2016 ATP Challenger Tour. It took place in Qingdao, China between 8 and 14 August 2016.

Singles main-draw entrants

Seeds

 1 Rankings are as of August 1, 2016.

Other entrants
The following players received wildcards into the singles main draw:
  Lyu Chengze
  Zheng Wei Qiang
  Te Rigele
  Wu Yibing

The following players entered as an alternate:
  Di Wu

The following players received entry from the qualifying draw:
  Jeevan Nedunchezhiyan
  Danilo Petrović
  Janko Tipsarević
  He Yecong

Champions

Singles

  Janko Tipsarević def.  Rubén Ramírez Hidalgo, 1–6, 7–5, 6–1

Doubles

  Danilo Petrović /  Tak Khunn Wang def.  Gong Maoxin /  Zhang Ze, 6–2, 4–6, [10–5]

References

ZS-Sports China International Challenger
2016 in Chinese tennis
Sport in Qingdao